Herzele is a municipality located in the Belgian province of East Flanders in the Denderstreek. In 2021, Herzele had a total population of 18,414. The total area is 47.40 km². The current mayor of Herzele is Johan Van Tittelboom, from the Open Flemish Liberals and Democrats party.

Herzele is crossed by two brooks, the Molenbeek in Borsbeke, Herzele, Ressegem, and Hillegem, as well as the Molenbeek-Ter Erpenbeek in Herzele, Sint-Lievens-Esse, Woubrechtegem, and Ressegem.

References

External links

Official website 

 
Municipalities of East Flanders
Populated places in East Flanders